The siege of Suncheon was an unsuccessful Korean and Chinese Allied Forces attempt to capture Suncheon Japanese Castle late in the Japanese invasions of Korea (1592–1598).

Siege
The allied army attacked on 19 October 1598. Initially they attempted to negotiate peace with Konishi Yukinaga in a ruse to lure him into the open where he could be killed, but it failed when their cannons fired too early and the Japanese forces returned to the fortress. Konishi tried to delay the attack by sending Liu a female companion the next day, but the allied forces attacked anyway. The allies proceeded to bombard them for three days. The allied forces made a frontal assault that failed and the Japanese sallied out, inflicting 800 casualties on the Ming, but failed to break the siege.

Chen Lin and Yi Sunsin attempted to land but were driven back by Japanese gunfire. They gave up on 21 October.

Eventually the land and naval forces conducted a joint attack on 31 October. Unfortunately the land assault failed to move past the first screen of defenses. After three attempts the attack was called off.

On 1 November the allied fleet bombarded the fortress, but a number of ships got stuck in the shallows and were attacked. They lost 39 ships.

I Sunsin continued his naval assault the next day but nothing came of it. The siege was lifted on 2 November.

See also
Battle of Sacheon (1598)
Second Siege of Ulsan
Japanese castles in Korea (Waeseong)

Citations

Bibliography

 
 
 
 
 
 
 
 
 
 
 桑田忠親 [Kuwata, Tadachika], ed., 舊參謀本部編纂, [Kyu Sanbo Honbu], 朝鮮の役 [Chousen no Eki]　(日本の戰史 [Nihon no Senshi] Vol. 5), 1965.
 
 
 
 
 
 
 
 
 
 
 
 
  
 
 
 
 
 
 

Suncheon
Sieges involving Japan
Sieges involving Korea
1598 in Asia
Conflicts in 1598
Yi Sun-sin